Events in the year 2018 in Puerto Rico.

Incumbents
 President: Donald Trump (Republican)
 Governor: Ricardo Rosselló
 Resident Commissioner: Jenniffer González

Events
18 April - Puerto Rico experiences an island-wide blackout after an excavator accidentally downs a transmission line.

Deaths

22 January – Shorty Castro, comedian, songwriter and entertainer (b. 1928).

24 January – Julio Navarro, baseball player (b. 1936)

11 March – Baltasar Corrada del Río, judge and politician (b. 1935)

14 March – Pijuan, pianist (b. 1942)

20 March – Sergio Peña Clos, politician (b. 1927)

References

 
2010s in Puerto Rico
Years of the 21st century in Puerto Rico
Puerto Rico
Puerto Rico